Casnate con Bernate is a comune (municipality) in the Province of Como in the Italian region Lombardy, about  north of Milan and about  south of Como.
It comprises the fractions of Casnate and Bernate, which once were distinct municipalities until they were merged in July 1937.

Casnate con Bernate borders the following municipalities: Como, Cucciago, Fino Mornasco, Grandate, Luisago, Senna Comasco.

Demographic evolution

References

Cities and towns in Lombardy